was the sixth vessel to be commissioned in the 19-vessel  destroyers built for the Imperial Japanese Navy in the late-1930s under the Circle Three Supplementary Naval Expansion Program (Maru San Keikaku).

Background
The Kagerō-class destroyers were outwardly almost identical to the preceding light cruiser-sized , with improvements made by Japanese naval architects to improve stability and to take advantage of Japan’s lead in torpedo technology. They were designed to accompany the Japanese main striking force and in both day and night attacks against the United States Navy as it advanced across the Pacific Ocean, according to Japanese naval strategic projections. Despite being one of the most powerful classes of destroyers in the world at the time of their completion, only one survived the Pacific War.

 Natsushio, built at the Fujinagata Shipyards, was laid down on 9 December 1937, launched on 23 February 1939 and commissioned on 31 August 1940.

Operational history

At the time of the attack on Pearl Harbor, Natsushio, was assigned to Destroyer Division 15 (Desdiv 15), and a member of Destroyer Squadron 2 (Desron 2) of the IJN 2nd Fleet, and had deployed from Palau, as part of the escort for the aircraft carrier  in the invasion of the southern Philippines and minelayer .

In early 1942, Natsushio participated in the invasion of the Netherlands East Indies, escorting the invasion forces for Menado, Kendari and Ambon in January. Ten crewmen were killed in the attack, and the survivors were rescued by her sister ship . Natsushio was removed from the navy list on 28 February 1942. She was the first Japanese destroyer to fall victim to U.S. submarines during the war, the first of her class to be sunk and the only Kagero-class destroyer to not partake in the Battle of Midway.

See also 
 List of ships of the Japanese Navy

Notes

Books

External links
 CombinedFleet.com: Kagero-class destroyers
 Natsushio history

Natsushio
Natsushio
Shipwrecks in the Makassar Strait
World War II shipwrecks in the Pacific Ocean
1939 ships
Maritime incidents in June 1941
Maritime incidents in February 1942
Ships sunk by American submarines
Ships built by Fujinagata Shipyards